Bison is an unincorporated community in Braxton County, West Virginia, United States.

References 

Unincorporated communities in West Virginia
Unincorporated communities in Braxton County, West Virginia